HMS Urchin was a Modified Admiralty  destroyer which served with the Royal Navy during the First World War. The Modified R class added attributes of the Yarrow Later M class to improve the capability of the ships to operate in bad weather. The destroyer was the third ship in the Navy to be named after the sea urchin and the first in the class to be built by Palmers in Jarrow. Launched in 1917, Urchin served with the Grand Fleet, seeing action in the Second Battle of Heligoland Bight. After the war, the destroyer was remained in service until being retired and sold to be broken up in 1930.

Design and development

Urchin was one of eleven Modified  destroyers ordered by the British Admiralty in March 1916 as part of the Eighth War Construction Programme. The design was a development of the existing R class, adding features from the Yarrow Later M class which had been introduced based on wartime experience. The forward two boilers were transposed and vented through a single funnel, enabling the bridge and forward gun to be placed further aft. Combined with hull-strengthening, this improved the destroyers' ability to operate at high speed in bad weather.

Two funnels were fitted.

Armament consisted of three single  Mk V QF guns on the ship's centreline, with one on the forecastle, one aft on a raised platform and one between the funnels. A single 2-pounder  "pom-pom anti-aircraft gun was carried on a platform between two twin mounts for  torpedoes. The ship had a complement of 82 officers and ratings.

Construction and career
Laid down by Palmers Shipbuilding and Iron Company at Jarrow at Greenock, Urchin  was launched on 7 June 1917 and completed in August. The vessel was the first of the class to be completed by the yard and was followed by sister ship . On commissioning, Urchin joined the Thirteenth Destroyer Flotilla of the Grand Fleet.

The destroyer formed part of small flotilla led by Ursa, commanded by John Tovey, that attacked the German ships with torpedoes.

At the end of the First World War, the destroyer was still part of the Thirteenth Destroyer Flotilla under the cruiser . but was reduced on 8 February 1919. On 6 August 1928, the destroyer transported a Spanish naval delegation to the Cowes Regatta. Soon after the vessel was retired and, on 7 January 1930, Urchin was sold to Metal Industries of Charlestown, Fife to be broken up.

Pennant numbers

References

Citations

Bibliography

 
 
 
 
 
 

 

1917 ships
R-class destroyers (1916)
Ships built on the River Tyne
World War I destroyers of the United Kingdom